Brentford is a town in Middlesex, West of London in England.

Brentford may also refer to:

Brentford F.C., an English football club
Viscount Brentford, a title in the Peerage of the United Kingdom
Battle of Brentford (1016)
Battle of Brentford (1642)
The Brentford Trilogy, a series of books written by Robert Rankin
Brentford, South Dakota, a town in Spink County, U.S.A.
 Brentford Bay

See also
Brantford (disambiguation)